Munjane (English : Dawn) is a 2012 released Kannada romantic drama film starring Ganesh and Manjari Phadnis. The film was written, produced and directed by S. Narayan, who also composed and written the songs and also acted in the film. Dharma Vish has scored the  background music. Narayan's wife, Bhagyavathi Narayan has produced the venture under his home banner. Jagadish Wali is the cinematographer. The film opened across Karnataka cinema halls on 2 March 2012.

Cast
 Ganesh as  Manumurthy alias Manu
 Manjari Phadnis as Pavithra 
 Malavika Avinash
 S. Narayan
 Raghavendra Joshi
 Rajendra Karanth
 M. N. Lakshmi Devi
BV Bhaskar

Reception

Critical response 

A critic from The Times of India scored the film at 3.5 out of 5 stars and says "Full marks to Ganesh who takes the story from the beginning to end with his marvellous performance, especially in the climax. Manjari impresses with her expressions. Rajendra Karanth and Malavika are gracious. Music by S Narayan and camera by JS Wali pass muster". Srikanth Srinivasa from Rediff.com scored the film at 3 out of 5 stars and wrote "Narayan has composed a few good songs including the Manase number. Waali's cinematography goes well with the pace of the movie. Munjaane is definitely a treat to watch". A critic from News18 India wrote "On the whole, it looks like Ganesh's performance is the only saving grace of 'Munjaane'. Otherwise it is another average fare". A critic from DNA wrote "Circumstances compel them to marry but they decide to live separately. Will they join hands to lead a happy married life? See it on the silver screen. The film is not so bad if you can sit through the first half, which tends to get a bit dragging at parts". A critic from Bangalore Mirror wrote  "The casting is good barring Malavika who is too young to be Ganesh’s mother and Manjari’s mother-in-law. Overall, the film is avoidable and you can only rue what it could have been".

Soundtrack

Director S. Narayan himself has composed 6 songs. All songs have been arranged and produced by Dharma Vish. The background music has been scored by Dharma Vish.

Awards

References

External links
 

2012 films
2010s Kannada-language films
Films directed by S. Narayan
2012 romantic drama films
Indian romantic drama films